Gandhi() is an Indian surname. Both Punjabis and Saraikis (Khatri/Arora) and Gujarati Baniyas can have 'Gandhi' as a surname. It is most commonly found among people living within and around the northern state of Punjab and the western state of Gujarat. 

Gandhi may also refer to:

Family of Mahatma Gandhi 

 Mohandas Karamchand Gandhi (1869–1948), known as the Mahatma.
 Kasturba Gandhi (1869–1944), wife
 Harilal Gandhi (1888–1948), eldest son
 Manilal Gandhi (1891–1956), second son
 Ela Gandhi (born 1940), South African politician
 Arun Gandhi (born 1934), head of M. K. Gandhi Institute for Non-violence
 Tushar Gandhi (born 1960), Indian politician and peace activist
 Ramdas Gandhi (1897–1969), third son
 Devdas Gandhi (1900–1957), youngest son
 Rajmohan Gandhi (born 1935), biographer
 Gopalkrishna Gandhi (born 1945), Indian administrator, former Governor of West Bengal and Bihar
 Ramchandra Gandhi (1937–2007), Indian philosopher
 Leela Gandhi (born 1966), postcolonial theorist
 Samaldas Gandhi (1897–1953), cousin who led the Arzi Hukumat during the Junagadh crisis

Family of Feroze Gandhi and Indira Gandhi

 Feroze Gandhi (1912–1960), husband of Indira Gandhi, real name Feroze Ghandy, Zoroastrian by religion
 Indira Gandhi (1917–1984), daughter of Jawaharlal Nehru and wife of Feroze Gandhi; former Prime Minister of India (1966–1977; 1980–1984)
 Rajiv Gandhi (1944–1991), son of Feroze & Indira Gandhi; former Prime Minister of India (1984–1989)
 Sonia Gandhi (born 1946), widow of Rajiv Gandhi; leader of the INC party (1998–2017, 2019–present)
 Rahul Gandhi (born 1970), son of Sonia Gandhi & Rajiv Gandhi; leader of the INC party (2017–2019)
 Priyanka Vadra (born 1971), daughter of Sonia Gandhi & Rajiv Gandhi.
 Sanjay Gandhi (1946–1980), son of Feroze & Indira Gandhi
 Maneka Gandhi (born 1956), widow of Sanjay Gandhi
 Varun Gandhi (born 1980), son of Sanjay & Maneka Gandhi

Other notable people
 Nisarg N. Gandhi (born 2000), a musician who performs as "Nisarg & The Indian Blanket"
 Anand Gandhi (born 1980), an Indian filmmaker
 Bhogilal Gandhi (1911–2001), Indian writer and independence activist from Gujarat
 Devang Gandhi (born 1971), an Indian cricketer
 Dharamvir Gandhi (born 1951), an Indian politician and physician 
 James Gandhi (born 1993), British actor, producer and writer
 Jonita Gandhi (born 1989), Canadian playback singer
 Kancheepuram (Kanchi) Natarajan Gandhi (born 1948), Senior Nomenclature Registrar and Bibliographer at Harvard University in the Department of Botany in the Harvard University Herbaria & Libraries (HUH and HUL)
 Kiran Gandhi (born 1989), a musician who also performs as "Madame Gandhi"
 Meera Gandhi (born 1963), founder of The Giving Back Foundation
 Nari Gandhi (1934–1993), an Indian architect
 Nikhita Gandhi (born 1991), Indian playback singer
 Rustom K. S. Ghandhi (1924 – 2014), an Indian Navy Admiral
 Shanta Gandhi (1917–2002), theatre director and playwright
 Sorab K. Ghandhi (1928-2018), professor Emeritus in electrical engineering at Rensselaer Polytechnic Institute
 Pooja Gandhi (born 1983), a Kannada film actress
 Pratik Gandhi (born 1989), a Gujarati / Hindi actor
 Virchand Gandhi (1864–1901), Jain representative at the first World Parliament of Religions in Chicago, 1893

See also
 Gandhi (disambiguation)
 Gandy (surname)
 Ghandy (surname)

References

Indian surnames
Perfumery
Perfumers
Incense in India
Occupational surnames